Vasas may refer to:

Vasas SC, Hungarian sports club
Győri Vasas, former name of Hungarian sports club Győri ETO (1950-65)
Mihály Vasas (born 1933), Hungarian footballer and manager
Zoltán Vasas (born 1977), Hungarian footballer

Hungarian-language surnames